Fred Howe may refer to:

 Fred Howe (footballer, born 1912) (1912–1984), English football striker for Liverpool and others
 Fred Howe (footballer, born 1895), English football wing half for Coventry City and Brentford